Svetlana Alekseevna Zhiltsova (born November 30, 1936) is a Soviet TV presenter, Honored Artist of the RSFSR (1978).

Biography 
Svetlana Alekseevna Zhiltsova was born November 30, 1936 in Moscow.

As a schoolgirl, she attended the Art studio at the Moscow Pioneers Palace. After high school, she enrolled into the Institute of Foreign Languages (English Language Faculty). After the graduation she got a job in television, initially as a program guide broadcaster.

Svetlana Zhiltsova hosted numerous children's programs, including "Funny Notes", "Alarm clock",  "Spokoynoy nochi, malyshi!", TV magazine "Pioneer", as well as various quiz shows for youngsters.

In 1961 she became the co-presenter of the popular KVN show, alongside Alexander Maslyakov.

She has participated in several training programs in English language. Twice in Japan she hosted the Russian language educational TV projects.

In 1993 she left television. Now Svetlana Zhiltsova is retired. She teaches at the Higher National School of Television.

In 2011 she was awarded the Order of Honor.

References

External links
  Светлана Жильцова at vokrug.tv
 Zhiltsova's biography at kino-cccp.net

1936 births
Living people
Soviet television presenters
Honored Artists of the RSFSR
Recipients of the Order of Honour (Russia)